Bhavra tehsil is a fourth-order administrative and revenue division, a subdivision of third-order administrative and revenue division of Alirajpur district of Madhya Pradesh.

Geography
Bhavra tehsil has an area of 279.94 sq kilometers. It is bounded by Gujrat in the north and northwest, Jhabua district in the east and northeast, Jobat tehsil in the south and southeast, Alirajpur tehsil in the west and southwest.

See also 
Alirajpur district

Citations

External links

Tehsils of Madhya Pradesh
Alirajpur district